The Anglican Diocese of Lafia is one of 13 within the Anglican Province of Abuja, itself one of 14 provinces within the Church of Nigeria. The diocese was created in 1999 and the current bishop is Godwin Adeyi Robinson who replaced the pioneer bishop Miller Maza on his retirement in 2017; Robinson was elected coadjutor and consecrated a bishop on 7 May 2017 at the Cathedral of the Transfiguration, Owerri.

References

 

Church of Nigeria dioceses
Dioceses of the Province of Abuja